The 2014–15 National Ringette League season for the soort of ringette was the 11th season of the National Ringette League and began on September 27, 2014 and ended on March 1, 2015.

Cambridge Turbos won their 4th title and became the team which wins the most championship in National Ringette League history.

Teams 
A team rejoined the National Ringette League this season.
 BC Thunder:West Division
Two teams did not join the league for two straight seasons.
Quebec City Cyclones
Prairie Fire

Regular Seasons 
East Division teams would play 28 games which consisted 1 to 4 games against same division team and some of those team will played against West Division teams 1, 2 or 4 games.

West Division teams would play 22 games which consisted 7 games against same division team and play 1, 2 or 4 game against East Division teams.

Development 
The National Ringette League introduced a new 3-referee officiating system.

Standings 
x indicates clinches the playoff
y indicates clinches the Championship (Elite Eight)

East Conference

West Conference

Playoffs 

Ottawa, Gloucester, Richmond Hill and Waterloo win the series in the knockout stage and go to the elite eight.
In the Elite eight, Cambridge finished the round robin first place and went to the final. Edmonton and Richmond Hill went to semifinal.
In the semifinal, Richmond Hill beat the Edmonton to the final but lost to Cambridge.
Cambridge beat the Richmond Hill 6–2 to win the fourth title.

Award 
MVP: Chantal St-Laurent (GAT)

Leaders

Regular season 
Player except goalie
Goal 
 East: Chantal St-Laurent (75, GAT)
 West: Dailyn Bell (24, EDM)
Assist
 East: Julie Blanchette (81, MTL)
 West: Dailyn Bell (28, EDM)
 Point
 East: Julie Blanchette (126, MTL)
 West: Dailyn Bell (52, EDM)
Goalie
Saving %
East Jessie Callander (.911, CAM)
West Amy Clarkson (.913, BC)
Goals against average
East Meghan Pittaway (3.01, CAM)
West Breanna Beck (2.97, EDM)
Win
East Jasmine LeBlanc (17, GLO)
West Bobbi Mattson (10, CGY)

Playoffs

References 

National Ringette League